Kali Ghata may refer to
 Kali Ghata (1951 film), a 1951 Hindi film directed by Kishore Sahu and starring Kishore Sahu, Bina Rai, and Asha Mathur.
 Kali Ghata (1980 film), a 1980 Hindi film directed by Ved Rahi and starring Shashi Kapoor and Rekha.